Axel Theodor Næss (19 December 1874 – 4 December 1945) was a Norwegian judge.

He was born in Mandal to printer and editor Anton August Næss and Angelica Thekla Schleusz. He graduated as cand.jur. in 1896, and was named as a Supreme Court Justice from 1927. He was a member of the supervisory council for Botsfengselet from 1920.

References

1874 births
1945 deaths
People from Mandal, Norway
Supreme Court of Norway justices